Martha Rae Watson (born August 19, 1946, in Long Beach, California, United States) is a retired American track and field athlete.  She qualified for four Olympics, 1964–1976 in the long jump, but also was a fast enough sprinter to be on two United States 4 x 100 metres relay teams.  She picked up the individual silver medal in the long jump and the gold in the 4 x 100 relay at the 1975 Pan American Games.  She was inducted into the National Track and Field Hall of Fame in 1987.

Barely after graduating from Long Beach Polytechnic High School, she qualified for her first Olympic team.  She joined Olympic teammate Wyomia Tyus in going to women's track powerhouse Tennessee State University.  She was the American Indoor Champion in the Long Jump 9 times; in 1965, 1967-9 and 1972–1976.  She also won three USA Outdoor Track and Field Championships, 1973-5 before losing to the high school phenom Kathy McMillan, who also went on to Tennessee State University.  Watson continued competing, jumping in the USA vs USSR meet of 1979, with the goal of making the 1980 Olympic team.  When President Jimmy Carter announced the 1980 Summer Olympics boycott, that "killed the spark."  By that point in time she had already found employment dealing Blackjack at Caesars Palace in Las Vegas.

Watson competed toward the end of the amateur era, when athletes were not officially allowed to make money from their athletic efforts.

References

External links
 

1946 births
Living people
American female sprinters
American female long jumpers
Olympic track and field athletes of the United States
Athletes (track and field) at the 1964 Summer Olympics
Athletes (track and field) at the 1967 Pan American Games
Athletes (track and field) at the 1968 Summer Olympics
Athletes (track and field) at the 1971 Pan American Games
Athletes (track and field) at the 1972 Summer Olympics
Athletes (track and field) at the 1975 Pan American Games
Athletes (track and field) at the 1976 Summer Olympics
Track and field athletes from Long Beach, California
Tennessee State Lady Tigers track and field athletes
Pan American Games gold medalists for the United States
Pan American Games silver medalists for the United States
Pan American Games medalists in athletics (track and field)
Medalists at the 1975 Pan American Games
Long Beach Polytechnic High School alumni